Nathan Solomon Kapahukula Knight (born September 20, 1997) is an American professional basketball player for the Minnesota Timberwolves of the National Basketball Association (NBA). He played college basketball for the William & Mary Tribe.

Early life and high school career
Knight grew up in Syracuse, New York and attended Nottingham High School. As a freshman, he was a pitcher on the baseball team before deciding to focus on basketball after experiencing a growth spurt. As a senior, he averaged 14.1 points and 7.4 rebounds per game and was named All-Central New York. Knight completed a postgraduate year at Kimball Union Academy in Meriden, New Hampshire. In AAU play, he competed for Gym Ratz, coached by Billy Edelin. On October 5, 2015, he committed to William & Mary over offers from Temple, Duquesne, George Mason, and Canisius among others. Knight appreciated the rich history of the College and felt at home on the campus, saying it was an easy decision to make.

College career
As a true freshman, Knight averaged 8.2 points and 4.4 rebounds per game in 31 games played (six starts). Coach Tony Shaver praised his work ethic for losing 45 pounds before his sophomore season. As a sophomore, he averaged 18.5 points, 7.3 rebounds and two blocks per game and was named second team All-Colonial Athletic Association (CAA). On February 9, 2019, Knight had a career-high 39 points to go with 14 rebounds at Hofstra. He followed that up with 35 points and 13 rebounds against Elon on February 16 and 30 points in a win over College of Charleston on February 21. Knight was named first team All-CAA as a junior after averaging 21 points, 8.6 rebounds, 3.5 assists and 2.3 blocks per game. Knight became the first college basketball player since Tim Duncan at Wake Forest University in 1997 to average 20 points, eight rebounds, three assists and two blocked shots per game, and his scoring average was the highest for a Tribe player since 1968. He also had 12 double-doubles. After entering the 2019 NBA draft, Knight withdrew from the draft before the deadline and decided to return to William & Mary for his senior season.

Coming into his senior season, coach Shaver was fired and replaced by Dane Fischer while four players transferred, though Knight decided to stay on the team. During his senior season, Knight put up 30-point games against Buffalo and Oklahoma. On January 4, 2020, Knight hit a last-second shot in a 66–64 win against Northeastern and finished with 23 points and 11 rebounds. On February 8, 2020, Knight passed the 2,000 career point mark by scoring 16 points while also grabbing 13 rebounds. He became the fourth player in program history to reach the milestone. At the conclusion of the regular season, Knight was named CAA Player of the Year and CAA Defensive Player of the Year. He became just the second men's basketball player in CAA history to earn both awards in the same season, joining George Mason's George Evans (1999, 2001). Knight finished the season averaging 20.7 points and 10.5 rebounds per game, the fourth CAA player to average 20 points and 10 rebounds in a season.

Professional career

Atlanta Hawks (2020–2021)
Knight was signed to a two-way contract by the Atlanta Hawks on November 19, 2020. He played 33 games for the Hawks in the 2020–21 season, averaging 3.8 points and 2.2 rebounds per game. He did not appear for the Hawks' NBA G League affiliate, the College Park Skyhawks, as the team sat out the season due to the COVID pandemic.

Minnesota Timberwolves (2021–present)
For the 2021–22 season, Knight signed another two-way deal, this time with the Minnesota Timberwolves and their G League affiliate, the Iowa Wolves. In his first career NBA start on December 27, 2021, Knight recorded 20 points, 11 rebounds, one steal, and one block in a win against the Boston Celtics.

On July 23, 2022, Knight re-signed with the Timberwolves.

Career statistics

NBA

Regular season

|-
| style="text-align:left;"| 
| style="text-align:left;"| Atlanta
| 33 || 0 || 8.5 || .370 || .182 || .800 || 2.2 || .2 || .3 || .3 || 3.8
|-
| style="text-align:left;"| 
| style="text-align:left;"| Minnesota
| 37 || 2 || 7.2 || .511 || .308 || .733 || 2.3 || .6 || .2 || .2 || 3.7
|- class="sortbottom"
| style="text-align:center;" colspan="2"| Career
| 70 || 2 || 7.8 || .436 || .217 || .765 || 2.2 || .4 || .2 || .3 || 3.7

Playoffs

|-
| style="text-align:left;"|2021
| style="text-align:left;"|Atlanta
| 6 || 0 || 2.3 || .286 || .000 || .000 || 1.0 || .0 || .0 || .3 || .7
|- class="sortbottom"
| style="text-align:center;" colspan="2"|Career
| 6 || 0 || 2.3 || .286 || .000 || .000 || 1.0 || .0 || .0 || .3 || .7

College

|-
| style="text-align:left;"| 2016–17
| style="text-align:left;"| William & Mary
| 31 || 6 || 17.2 || .578 || .167 || .594 || 4.4 || 1.1 || .4 || 1.3 || 8.2
|-
| style="text-align:left;"| 2017–18
| style="text-align:left;"| William & Mary
| 31 || 30 || 28.7 || .575 || .306 || .769 || 7.3 || 2.2 || .6 || 2.0 || 18.5
|-
| style="text-align:left;"| 2018–19
| style="text-align:left;"| William & Mary
| 31 || 30 || 30.6 || .578 || .244 || .732 || 8.6 || 3.5 || .4 || 2.3 || 21.0
|-
| style="text-align:left;"| 2019–20
| style="text-align:left;"| William & Mary
| 32 || 32 || 29.6 || .524 || .305 || .773 || 10.5 || 1.8 || .8 || 1.5 || 20.7
|- class="sortbottom"
| style="text-align:center;" colspan="2"| Career
| 125 || 98 || 26.6 || .560 || .283 || .736 || 7.7 || 2.1 || .5 || 1.8 || 17.1

Personal life
Knight is the youngest of four children. In December 2008, Knight's 18-year-old sister Yeisha Howard was stabbed to death in Syracuse. According to the prosecutor, it was part of a longstanding feud, and the perpetrator of the attack was sentenced to seven years in prison.

References

External links

William & Mary Tribe bio

1997 births
Living people
African-American basketball players
American men's basketball players
Atlanta Hawks players
Basketball players from Syracuse, New York
Centers (basketball)
Iowa Wolves players
Minnesota Timberwolves players
Power forwards (basketball)
Undrafted National Basketball Association players
William & Mary Tribe men's basketball players